The Winfield Daily Courier was a local newspaper from Winfield, Kansas.

History
It was one of two local newspapers under the same ownership that published in Cowley County, Kansas - the other being The Arkansas City Traveler.  The publication of the newspaper dated back to 1931.  The newspaper was previously published under the name Winfield Daily Free Press from 1924 until 1931.

In 2017, The Arkansas City Traveler and The Winfield Daily Courier merged into a new publication named The Cowley Courier Traveler.

See also
 List of newspapers in Kansas

References

External links
 Current The Cowley Courier Traveler official website
 Former The Winfield Daily Courier website archived on the Wayback Machine at archive.org

Newspapers published in Kansas
Cowley County, Kansas